Etropus is a genus of large-tooth flounders native to the coastal waters of the Americas.

Species
There are currently nine recognized species in this genus:
 Etropus ciadi van der Heiden & Plascencia González, 2005
 Etropus crossotus D. S. Jordan & C. H. Gilbert, 1882 (Fringed flounder)
 Etropus cyclosquamus Leslie & D. J. Stewart, 1986 (Shelf flounder)
 Etropus delsmani Chabanaud, 1940
 Etropus delsmani delsmani Chabanaud, 1940
 Etropus delsmani pacificus J. G. Nielsen, 1963 (Delsman's flounder)
 Etropus ectenes D. S. Jordan, 1889 (Sole flounder)
 Etropus longimanus Norman, 1933
 Etropus microstomus (T. N. Gill, 1864) (Smallmouth flounder)
 Etropus peruvianus Hildebrand, 1946 (Peruvian flounder)
 Etropus rimosus Goode & T. H. Bean, 1885 (Gray flounder)

References

Paralichthyidae
Marine fish genera
Taxa named by David Starr Jordan
Taxa named by Charles Henry Gilbert